Beauchemin is a French surname. Notable people with the name include:

 André Beauchemin (1824–1902), Canadian politician in Manitoba
 François Beauchemin (born 1980), Canadian ice hockey defenceman
 Georges Beauchemin (1891–1957), Canadian singer and veterinarian
 Jean-Baptiste Beauchemin (1838–1900), Canadian political figure in Manitoba
 Karen Beauchemin Canadian scientist and ruminant nutritionist
 Micheline Beauchemin (1929–2009), Canadian textile artist and weaver
 Nérée Beauchemin (1850–1931), French Canadian poet and physician
 Yves Beauchemin (born 1941), Quebec novelist

See also
 Marie-Ève Beauchemin-Nadeau (born 1988), Canadian weightlifter
 Catherine Beauchemin-Pinard (born 1994), Canadian judoka
 Tina Cardinale-Beauchemin (born 1966), American ice hockey player
 Charles-Odilon Beauchemin (1822–1887) Canadian printer and bookseller
 Beauchemin, commune in the Haute-Marne département of north-eastern France

French-language surnames